Martin Mathis is an American football coach. He served as the head football coach at Bethel College in North Newton, Kansas from 2013 to 2014. He was hired beginning with the 2013 season.  Mathis replaced James Dotson, who held the position for one season after the sudden resignation of Travis Graber on July 27, 2012. Mathis resigned as head coach of Bethel on March 5, 2015 to take a job with Walsh University in North Canton, Ohio. He was replaced by Morris Lolar.

Head coaching record

References

Year of birth missing (living people)
Living people
American football linebackers
Alderson Broaddus Battlers football coaches
Bethel Threshers football coaches
Marian Knights football coaches
Minnesota Golden Gophers football players
Rose–Hulman Fightin' Engineers football coaches
Walsh Cavaliers football coaches
High school football coaches in Kentucky
High school football coaches in Ohio